Goduine Koyalipou (born 15 February 2000) is a professional footballer who plays as a winger for  club Avranches on loan from the Swiss club Lausanne-Sport. Born in the Central African Republic, he moved to France at a young age and represented France U19s.

Club career
Koyalipou moved to France from the Central African Republic as a young child, and joined the Niort academy at the age of 7. Koyalipou made his professional debut for Niort in a 2–1 Ligue 2 loss to Stade de Reims on 8 December 2017. He signed his first professional contract on 26 January 2018.

Koyalipou signed for Swiss club Lausanne-Sport in June 2021. On 4 January 2023, he was loaned to Avranches in Championnat National.

International career
Born in Central African Republic, Koyalipou represents France internationally. He was called up to the France U18s for a friendly tournament in April 2018.
After more than two years without being called to France's youth teams and irregular seasons, in January 2021, Koyalipou expressed his desire to represent  Central African Republic

References

External links
 
 
 
 Chamois Niortais Profile
 
 

2000 births
People from Bangui
French sportspeople of Central African Republic descent
Central African Republic emigrants to France
Living people
Central African Republic footballers
French footballers
France youth international footballers
Association football midfielders
Chamois Niortais F.C. players
FC Lausanne-Sport players
US Avranches players
Ligue 2 players
Championnat National 3 players
Swiss Super League players
Swiss Challenge League players
Championnat National players
French expatriate footballers
Expatriate footballers in Switzerland
French expatriate sportspeople in Switzerland